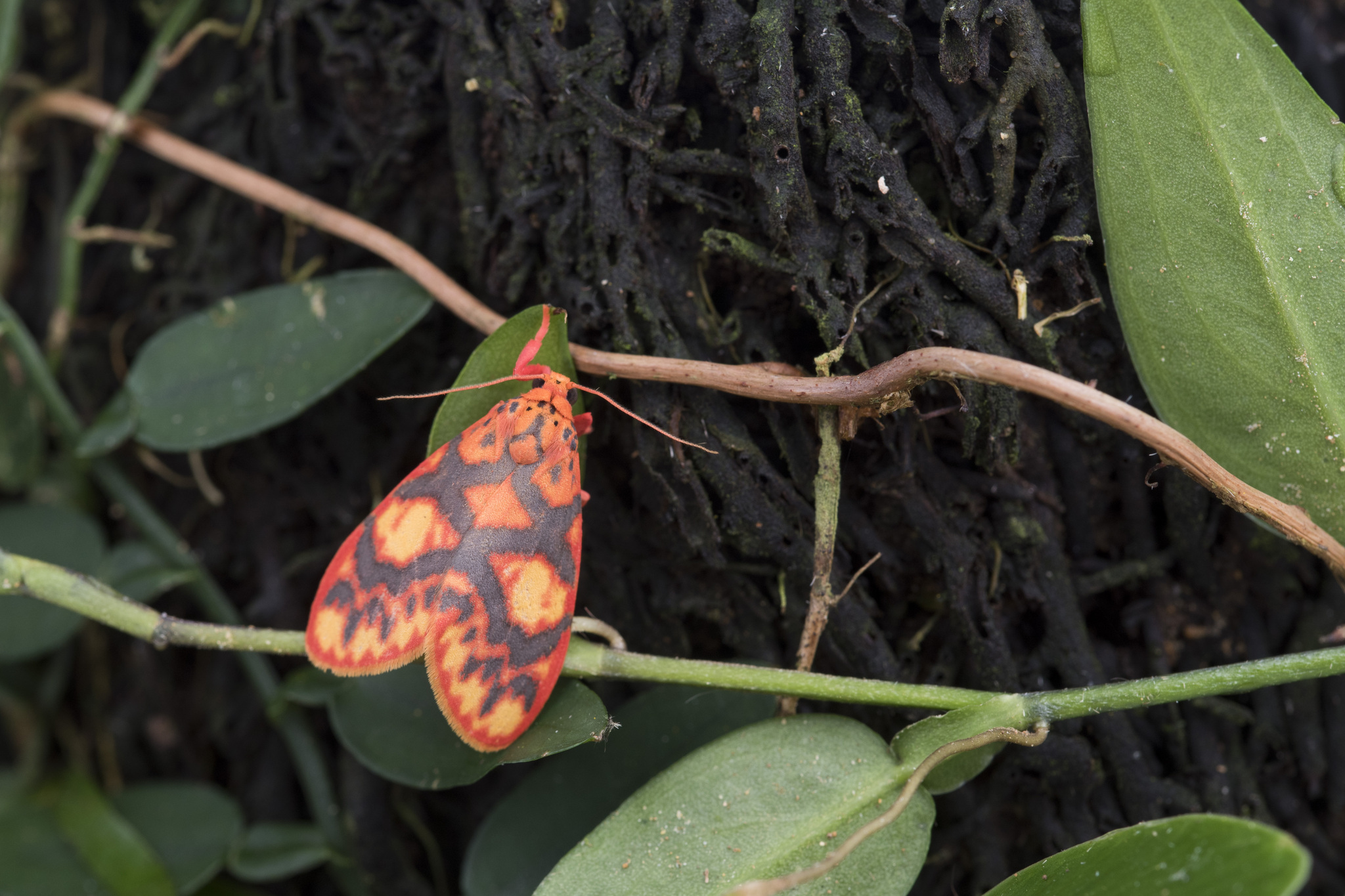
- Floridasura tricolor, Taiwan

Scientific classification
- Domain: Eukaryota
- Kingdom: Animalia
- Phylum: Arthropoda
- Class: Insecta
- Order: Lepidoptera
- Superfamily: Noctuoidea
- Family: Erebidae
- Subfamily: Arctiinae
- Tribe: Lithosiini
- Genus: Floridasura
- Species: F. tricolor

Binomial name
- Floridasura tricolor (Wileman, 1910)

Synonyms
- Miltochrista tricolor Wileman, 1910

= Floridasura tricolor =

Species of moth

Floridasura tricolor is a species of moth in the family Erebidae. It is found in temperate and southeast Asia.
